Headed may refer to:
A headed phrase, in linguistics
Headed notepaper

See also

 Head (disambiguation)
 Header (disambiguation)
 Heading (disambiguation)